Yalıkavak is a town near Bodrum in Muğla Province, on the Aegean coast of Turkey. Yalıkavak is surrounded by hills providing views of the town and surrounding Aegean coastline, and there are several beaches and bays in the vicinity.

The Yalıkavak area has been inhabited since around the second millennium BCE. Formerly the Bodrum area’s main sponge diving port, Yalikavak is now a tourism hub and location for many holiday residences. The town has a bustling centre with weekly markets (Tuesdays produce, Thursdays textiles and household items) and numerous shops and restaurants.

In 2009 Yalikavak hosted the RS:X Youth World Championships in windsurfing, with 109 competitors taking part.

The Yalıkavak Marina, a major commercial development within the town, provides 620 berths for yachts up to 135m in length, as well as housing a range of shopping, dining and leisure facilities.

Gallery

References

External links
 Municipality of Bodrum official site
 Yalıkavak Marina website

Populated places in Muğla Province
Bodrum
Populated coastal places in Turkey
Seaside resorts in Turkey
Aegean Sea port cities and towns in Turkey
Fishing communities in Turkey
Towns in Turkey